The Men's 2013 European Amateur Boxing Championships were held in Minsk, Belarus from June 1 to June 8, 2013. It is the 40th edition of this biennial competition organised by the European governing body for amateur boxing, the EUBC.

37 countries, 208 sportsmen took part in the competition.

The organization of this championships cost 11 billion Br (Belarusian currency, 1 mln. Eu) for the Belarusian government.

Schedule
From 1 June–3 June the preliminaries were held, on June 4–05 the quarterfinals in all categories were held. The semifinals took place on June 7 with the finals at June 08.

Medal winners

Medal table

References

External links
Official Website
European Boxing Confederation  
 

European Amateur Boxing Championships
European Amateur Boxing Championships
2013 European Amateur Boxing Championships
2013 in Belarusian sport
International sports competitions hosted by Belarus
June 2013 sports events in Europe
2010s in Minsk